The men's 300 m time trial competition in inline speed skating at the 2001 World Games took place on 24 August 2001 at the Akita Prefectural Skating Rink in Akita, Japan.

Competition format
A total of 24 athletes entered the competition. Athlete with the fastest time is a winner.

Results

References

External links
 Results on IWGA website

Inline speed skating at the 2001 World Games